HD 181068 is a star system in the constellation of Lyra. With an apparent magnitude of 7.09, the system is not visible to the naked eye but may be viewed with a pair of binoculars. Based on parallax measurements made by the Hipparcos spacecraft, the system is some 810 light years (250 parsecs) away from Earth.

HD 181068 is in the Kepler spacecraft's field of view, and its unique properties were first observed by the satellite's photometer. It consists of a red giant, designated HD 181068 A, along with two main-sequence stars, designated HD 181068 Ba and HD 181068 Bb, respectively. Normal eclipsing binaries have two components that pass in front of each other while eclipsing. However, all three components of HD 181068 orbit each other in such a way that they eclipse each other, forming a rare triply eclipsing system.

The primary star is also unusual in that it does not exhibit internal seismic oscillations as have been detected in other red giants, although tidal forces from the closer pair may possibly be causing other variability in the light curve of the system.

HD 181068 Ba and Bb have spectral types of G8V and K1V respectively, indicating their location on the main sequence, slightly later than the Sun. They are in a close orbit and complete an orbit once every 0.906 days (about 21.7 hours), while they orbit HD 181068 A every 45.5 days. All three stars have similar surface brightnesses and colors, so when the two companions eclipse the red giant, the change in brightness is very slight and hard to detect.

See also
HD 188753, a triple star system with a possible exoplanet companion

References

181068
094780
G-type giants
G-type main-sequence stars
K-type main-sequence stars
Eclipsing binaries
Triple star systems
Durchmusterung objects
Lyra (constellation)